The 1993 NCAA Women's Golf Championships were contested at the 12th annual NCAA-sanctioned golf tournament to determine the individual and team national champions of women's collegiate golf in the United States. Until 1996, the NCAA would hold just one annual women's golf championship for all programs across Division I, Division II, and Division III.

The tournament was held again at the University of Georgia Golf Course in Athens, Georgia.

Arizona State won the team championship, the Sun Devils' second.

Charlotta Sörenstam, from Texas, won the individual title.

Individual results

Individual champion
 Charlotta Sorenstam, Texas (287, −5)

Team leaderboard

 DC = Defending champion
 Debut appearance

References

NCAA Women's Golf Championship
Golf in Georgia (U.S. state)
NCAA Women's Golf Championship
NCAA Women's Golf Championship
NCAA Women's Golf Championship